Makapuʻu Point (also Makapuu Point) is the easternmost point on the Hawaiian island of Oʻahu, located in the Makapuʻu region. Twelve miles east of Honolulu, it is a popular hiking spot, offering great views of Makapuʻu and Waimanalo Bay on one side and the Ka ʻIwi Channel on the other side. It is the home of the Makapuʻu Point Light, which was established in 1909; the light was automated in 1974.
Containing one of the world's largest Fresnel lenses. The Light House is lit by a single 1000 watt 120 volt alternating current lamp. Should the first lamp burn out a tangent lamp will automatically rotate into place. The light house and the area around it is owned by the U.S. Coast Guard.

The location is also popular for viewing the ocean, whale watching in the Winter, or seeing the neighboring islands of Molokai and Lanai. Additionally, one of the popular "first kisses" from the romantic comedy, 50 First Dates, was filmed aside the lighthouse with the camera spanning the picturesque landscape.

References
Inventory of Historic Light Stations - Hawaiʻi Lighthouses
State of Hawaii Beautification Work at Makapuʻu
Makapu's Point Lighthouse

External links
360 Panorama of Makapu'u Point and Lighthouse from PanaViz

Headlands of Hawaii
Landforms of Oahu
Tourist attractions in Honolulu
East Honolulu, Hawaii